Taffy may refer to:


People
 English term for a Welsh person (as used in the rhyme Taffy was a Welshman)
 Taffy (nickname), various people
 Taffy (singer) (born 1963), British singer
 Taffy Thomas, British storyteller, appointed the UK's first Laureate for Storytelling in 2010

Arts and entertainment
 "Taffy" (song), by Lisa Loeb, 1995
 Taffy (TV series)
 Taffy, a character in the ClayFighter series of video games
 "Taffy!", an episode of Anne of Green Gables: The Animated Series

Other uses
 Taffy (candy), a type of chewy, often colored, candy
 Taffy, a nickname for Navy Task Units in World War II
 Taffy Entertainment

See also
 Toffee